782 Naval Air Squadron (782 NAS) was a Naval Air Squadron of the Royal Navy's Fleet Air Arm. It initially formed in November 1939 as an Armament Training Squadron but disbanded in December to provide personnel for 774 Naval Air Squadron.

In December 1940 it reformed at RNAS Donibristle as the Northern Communications Squadron, providing links between the Naval Air Stations in Scotland, Northern Ireland, and the Shetland and Orkney islands. It finally disbanded in October 1953.

Aircraft flown
The squadron operated a variety of different aircraft, including:
Avro Anson
Beech Expeditor
de Havilland Dominie
de Havilland Flamingo
Handley Page Harrow

References

Citations

Bibliography

700 series Fleet Air Arm squadrons
Military units and formations established in 1939
Military units and formations of the Royal Navy in World War II